Hudson Branch is a  long 2nd order tributary to the Hyco River in Halifax County, Virginia.

Course
Hudson Branch rises in a pond in Centerville, Virginia, and then flows southeast to join the Hyco River about 2.5 miles southeast of Centerville.

Watershed
Hudson Branch drains  of area, receives about 45.7 in/year of precipitation, has a wetness index of 384.85, and is about 67% forested.

See also
List of rivers of Virginia

References

Rivers of Virginia
Rivers of Halifax County, Virginia
Tributaries of the Roanoke River